The National African American Archives and Museum, formerly known as the Davis Avenue Branch of Mobile Public Library, is an archive and history museum located in Mobile, Alabama.  It serves as a repository for documents, records, photographs, books, African carvings, furniture, and special collections that relate to the African-American experience in the United States. Some of the collection was developed when the building was part of the Mobile Public Library as the Davis Avenue Branch.

History 
The Davis Avenue Branch of the Mobile Public Library was built in 1931 to serve
the needs of the local African-American community. The state was racially segregated and they had been prohibited from using libraries designated for whites. The three-room building was designed by architect George Bigelow Rogers and built for $26,000. The building was modeled after the Ben May Main Library but constructed on a smaller scale. The local African-American community helped collect used books for the library and to raise funds for the acquisition of new books. During this period of Jim Crow, segregation and the disenfranchisement of African Americans in the state since the turn of the century resulted in underfunding of facilities for them by the state and local governments. African Americans also attended separate schools.

A minor addition was made to the building in 1961. Following desegregation in the late 1960s after federal civil rights legislation was passed, this branch library became used as a storage repository for government documents. The former library building was listed on the National Register of Historic Places in 1983.

In 1992 the city council of Mobile leased this building to a community group that founded the National African American Archives here. It was founded by Delores S. Dees, the organization's first president and executive director. They later expanded the reach of the institution, and added "and Multicultural Museum" to its title to express this. Its exhibits interpret the history of African Americans in the city and state, and in the United States. The collection includes documents, records, photographs, books, African carvings, furniture, and special collections that relate to the African-American experience in the United States.

Exhibits
Exhibits include the History of Colored Carnival, which describes African-American contributions to Carnival and Mardi Gras celebrations in Mobile and New Orleans. The Slavery Artifacts exhibit features displays of historic shackles, leg irons, slave collars, slave bracelets, and slave badges from the slavery centuries.

The museum also features artifacts representing the numerous contributions African Americans have made to greater Mobile. They were among the thousands of defense workers in the shipyards during World War II.  Such accomplished figures as baseball legend Hank Aaron and U.S. Labor Secretary Alexis Herman both came from Mobile, and they are each represented in the museum's collection.  The museum also contains a military section, which includes memorabilia of Major general Jerome G. Cooper, the first African American to command a United States Marine Corps infantry company.

Mobile was the 1860 destination for the last known illegal slave ship, the Clotilda, which journey was arranged by planters in the region using a private yacht. The slaves were distributed among the different sponsors after landing in Mobile. After the Civil War, many gathered after emancipation, establishing an independent community of Africatown near where they disembarked. This area was later absorbed by the city of Mobile. In May 2019, remnants of ship found along the Mobile River, near 12 Mile Island and just north of the Mobile Bay delta were confirmed as those of the Clotilda.

See also

List of museums focused on African Americans

References

External links
Library of Congress Page for National African-American Archives and Museum

Museums in Mobile, Alabama
National Register of Historic Places in Mobile, Alabama
Archives in the United States
George Bigelow Rogers buildings
African-American museums in Alabama
African American Heritage Trail of Mobile
Neoclassical architecture in Alabama
Black studies organizations